Abu Taher Mohammad Shamsuzzaman (10 September 1941 – 20 February 2021), better known as known as ATM Shamsuzzaman, was a Bangladeshi film and television actor, director and screen-playwright. He was awarded Ekushey Padak in 2015 by the Government of Bangladesh. He won Bangladesh National Film Awards five times for his roles in Dayee Ke? (1987), Madam Fuli (1999),  Churiwala (2001), Mon Bosena Porar Table E (2009) and Chorabali (2012).

Early life and career
Shamsuzzaman was born into a Bengali Muslim family at his maternal home in Daulatpur, Noakhali on 10 September 1941. His ancestral paternal home is in Bholakot Boro Bari in Ramganj, Lakshmipur District. His father was Nuruzzaman, a wakil who worked with A. K. Fazlul Huq, and his mother was Nurunnisa Begum. Shamsuzzaman was the eldest child of a family of five sons and three sisters.

His family moved to Dhaka and lived in Debendranath Das Lane in Old Dhaka. He began his schooling in Dhaka at Pogose School, where he was friends with Prabir Mitra, who would also grow up to be an actor. His film career began with filmmaker Udayan Chowdhury as an assistant director in films "Manusher Bhagban" and "Bishwokanya". He got his breakthrough through his role in the film "Nayanmoni" (1976), directed by Amjad Hossain. Earlier he played the role of  Ramzan in the play Sangsaptak, aired in 1960.

Controversy
According to a probe report of "Nilima Ibrahim Committee", a six-member committee led by educationist Nilima Ibrahim, Shamsuzzaman was suspended from the television and radio programmes because of his alleged role in favor of Pakistan army during the Bangladesh Liberation War in 1971. According to him; During Liberation war Pakistani Army forced him to attend alleged role in favor of Pakistan

Personal life
Shamsuzzaman married Runy Begum in 1968. They had three sons and three daughters. In March 2012, one of his sons, ATM Kholikuzzaman Kushol, killed another son ATM Kamaluzzaman Kabir. Shamsuzzaman testified in court and in 2014, Kushol was sentenced to life in prison.

Filmography

Awards and nominations
 Ekushey Padak (2015)

Death
Shamsuzzaman died at his residence in Sutrapur neighborhood of Dhaka on 20 February 2021 at around 9 am. He had been suffering from various diseases due to old age for a long time.

References

External links
 
 ATM Shamsuzzaman on Facebook

1941 births
2021 deaths
People from Ramganj Upazila
Bangladeshi male film actors
Bangladeshi male television actors
Bangladeshi dramatists and playwrights
Bangladeshi film directors
20th-century Bangladeshi male actors
National Film Award (Bangladesh) for Lifetime Achievement recipients
Recipients of the Ekushey Padak
Bangladeshi comedians
Best Actor National Film Award (Bangladesh) winners
Best Performance in a Comic Role National Film Award (Bangladesh) winners
21st-century Bengalis
20th-century Bengalis
Pogose School alumni